This page lists Japan-related articles with romanized titles beginning with the letters U and V. For names of people, please list by surname (i.e., "Tarō Yamada" should be listed under "Y", not "T"). Please also ignore particles (e.g. "a", "an", "the") when listing articles (i.e., "A City with No People" should be listed under "City").

Ub–Ud
Ube, Yamaguchi
Ubuyama, Kumamoto
Uchi-deshi
Uchiko, Ehime
Uchimizu
Uchimura Kanzō
Uchinomi, Kagawa
Uchinoura, Kagoshima
Uchita, Wakayama
Uchiumi, Ehime
Uda District, Nara
Udon
Udon kiri
Udono, Mie

Ue–Uj
Uechi-ryū
Ueda, Nagano (former city)
Ueda, Nagano (new city)
Ueda Akinari
Bin Ueda
Kyohei Ueda
Makoto Ueda (architecture critic)
Makoto Ueda (poetry critic)
Yūji Ueda
Ueki, Kumamoto
Kazuhide Uekusa
Nobuo Uematsu
Ueno, Gunma
Ueno, Okinawa
Ueno, Mie
Ueno, Tokyo
Ueno Station
Morihei Ueshiba
Moriteru Ueshiba
Uesugi Kenshin
Kazushige Ugaki
Ugo Province
Uirō
Uji
Ujitawara

Uk–Ul
Ukan
Uke (martial arts)
Uken
Ukichiro Nakaya
Ukiha District, Fukuoka
Ukiha, Fukuoka
Ukiyo-e
Ukyō-ku, Kyoto
Ultimate Muscle
Ultra Games
Ultraman
Ulysses 31

Um–Uo
Uma District, Ehime
Umaji, Kōchi
Umami
Ume
Ume, Ōita
Umeda
Mochio Umeda
Umeda Station
Kazuo Umezu
Umi, Fukuoka
Unagisaki hōchō
Uncanny valley
Underground (Murakami book)
Unit 731
United Nations University
United States Forces Japan
Universal Century
University of Tokyo
Unno Juza
Sōsuke Uno
Unseen world
Uoshima, Ehime
Uozu, Toyama

Ur
Uraga Channel
Urashima Tarō
Urasoe, Okinawa
Urawa, Saitama
Urawa Red Diamonds
Urayasu
Ureshino, Mie
Ureshino, Saga
Urokotori
Urusei Yatsura
Usa District, Ōita
Usa, Ōita
Usagi Tsukino
Usagi Yojimbo
Ushibuka, Kumamoto
Ushiku, Ibaraki
Ushimado, Okayama
Ushizu, Saga
USS Greeneville (SSN-772)
Usu (mortar)
Usui Mikao
Usui, Fukuoka
Usuki, Ōita

Ut–Uz
Uta-garuta
Hikaru Utada
Utagawa school
Utamakura
Utamakura (Utamaro)
Utamaro
Utano, Nara
Utashinai, Hokkaidō
Utazu
UTF-2000
Uto District, Kumamoto
Uto, Kumamoto
Utsunomiya
Uub (Dragon Ball)
Uwa, Ehime
Uwajima, Ehime
Uzen Province

V
Vagabond (manga)
Vaio
Vajrayana
Vandread
Vegalta Sendai
Vegeta
Vegeta Saga
VHS
Villages of Japan
Video Girl Ai
Virtua Fighter
Visas and Virtue
The Vision of Escaflowne
Vissel Kobe
Visual kei
Voice acting in Japan
Voices of a Distant Star

U